Counterintelligence organizations and agencies attempt to prevent foreign intelligence organizations from successfully gathering and collecting intelligence against the governments they serve.

Active counterintelligence organizations

Currently active counterintelligence organizations include the following. For former agencies, see the  separate list below.

Australia
Australian Security Intelligence Organisation (ASIO)
Australian Secret Intelligence Service (ASIS)

Bangladesh
 National Security Intelligence (NSI)
 Directorate General of Forces Intelligence (DGFI)

Belarus
State Security Committee of the Republic of Belarus

Belgium
Belgian State Security Service — in Dutch, Staatsveiligheid (SV); in French, Sûreté de l'État (SE)
Belgian General Information and Security Service — in Dutch, Algemene Dienst Inlichting en Veiligheid (ADIV); in French Service Général du Renseignement et de la Sécurité (SGRS)

Brazil
Agência Brasileira de Inteligência (ABIN)

Canada
Canadian Security Intelligence Service (CSIS)
Canadian Forces National Counter-Intelligence Unit (CFNCIU),operated by the Canadian Forces Military Police Group

Croatia
Security and Intelligence Agency (SOA)
Military Security and Intelligence Agency (VSOA)

Czech Republic
 Bezpečnostní informační služba (BIS) — Security Information Service

Denmark
Politiets Efterretningstjeneste (PET)

Estonia
Estonian Internal Security Service (KaPo)

Finland
Finnish Security Intelligence Service (SuPo)

France
Direction générale de la sécurité intérieure (DGSI)

Germany
Bundesnachrichtendienst (BND)
Bundesamt für Verfassungsschutz (BfZ)
Militärischer Abschirmdienst (MAD)

Greece
Hellenic National Intelligence Service (NIS-EYP) Sub-Directorate for International Terrorism and Organized Crime

Hungary
Constitution Protection Office (Hungary) (NBH)

Iceland
Greiningardeild Ríkislögreglustjóra - National Security Unit

India
Intelligence Bureau (IB)
Central Bureau of Investigation (CBI)
Research and Analysis Wing (RAW)

Ireland
Defence Forces Directorate of Military Intelligence
Garda Crime & Security Branch (CSB)

Iran
Ministry of Intelligence and National Security of Iran

Israel
Mossad
Shin Bet (official name is Shabak)

Italy
Agenzia Informazioni e Sicurezza Interna (AISI), formerly known as SISDE

Japan
National Police Agency Security Bureau (警察庁警備局, Keisatsu-chō Keibi-kyoku), commonly known as ":ja:公安警察, Kōan-Keisatsu, which means "public security police"" or shortly "公安, Kōan" in Japan.
 Public Security Intelligence Agency (公安調査庁, Kōanchōsa-chō)
SDF Intelligence Security Command (自衛隊情報保全隊 Jieitai Jōhō-Hozentai)

Kenya
National Security Intelligence Service  (NSIS)

Lebanon
Special Agency to Combat Terrorism

the Netherlands
 Algemene Inlichtingen- en Veiligheidsdienst (AIVD) — General Intelligence and Security Service
Militaire Inlichtingen- en Veiligheidsdienst (MIVD) — Military Intelligence and Security Service

New Zealand
New Zealand Security Intelligence Service

Pakistan
Inter-Services Intelligence

Poland
Agencja Bezpieczeństwa Wewnetrznego (ABW) — en. Internal Security Agency
Służba Kontrwywiadu Wojskowego (SKW); en. Military Counterintelligence Service

Portugal
Serviço de Informações e Segurança (SIS)

Romania
Serviciul Român de Informaţii (SRI)
Directorate for Military Security

Russian Federation
Federal Security Service (FSB)

Serbia
Bezbednosno-informativna agencija (BIA)
Vojnobezbednosna agencija (VBA), Military Security Agency (successor of Yugoslav Kontraobaveštajna služba)

Sweden
Säkerhetspolisen (Säpo) — Swedish Security Service

Switzerland
 Federal Office of Police — in German, Bundesamt für Polizei (BAP); in French, Office fédéral de la police; in Italian, Ufficio federale di polizia

Slovakia
 Národný bezpečnostný úrad (NBÚ) — National Security Bureau

South Africa
National Intelligence Agency (NIA)

South Korea
National Intelligence Service (NIS)
Defense Counterintelligence Command (DCC)

Turkey
National Intelligence Organization (Turkey) (MIT)
Higher Counterterrorism Council

Ukraine
Security Service of Ukraine (SBU)

United Kingdom
Security Service, commonly known as MI5
Secret Intelligence Service, also known as MI6
Royal Air Force Police Counter Intelligence Squadron

United States
Federal Bureau of Investigation (FBI)
United States Army Counterintelligence (ACI)
Air Force Office of Special Investigations (AFOSI)
DIA's Defense Counterintelligence and Human Intelligence Center (DCHC)
Diplomatic Security Service (DSS), U.S. Department of State (DS/ICI/CI)
Naval Criminal Investigative Service (NCIS, formerly NIS)
United States Marine Corps Counterintelligence
Office of the National Counterintelligence Executive (ONCIX)
Central Intelligence Agency (CIA)

Defunct counterintelligence organizations

These organizations are now defunct, possibly absorbed by a successor organization:

Ireland
Army Intelligence Department
Criminal Investigation Department (CID)

Nazi Germany
Geheime Staatspolizei (Gestapo)
Geheime Feldpolizei (GFP) (Secret Field Police) (1939-1945)
Sicherheitsdienst — Security Service of the SS, particularly the "inland SS" branch
 Abwehr (military intelligence)

Empire of Japan
 Kenpeitai - Army military police
 Tokubetsu Keisatsutai - Navy military police
Tokubetsu Kōtō Keisatsu (特別高等警察, Special Higher Police) - civil police

Poland
Wojskowe Służby Informacyjne (WSI) — dissolved in 2006 for having been involved in illegal activities

Yugoslavia
 Kontraobaveštajna služba (KOS), Army Counter-Intelligence Service
Uprava Državne Bezbednosti (UDBA), State Security Directorate

Soviet Union and Imperial Russia
 Committee for State Security (KGB) — previously MGB, NKVD, OGPU, Cheka, and, during  imperial times, Okhrana

Ukraine
Kontrrazvedka, Makhnovist counterintelligence agency

United Kingdom
14 Intelligence Company — also known as "the Det"

United States
Army Counter Intelligence Corps
Counterintelligence Field Activity

References

C